Strength was a Japanese hardcore band formed in Sendai, Japan. They played not only in their hometown Sendai but also in numerous places such as Tokyo and Osaka. They are known as one of the earliest bands who formed the basis of the Sendai hardcore group Merauder.

Band members 
Aniki - vocals (1996–2003)
You - guitar (1996–2000), now in Cuishlowmath (ex. Inner Struggle)
Keiji - guitar (1996–2000)
Katsu - bass (1996–2000), guitar (2000–2003)
Tadano - drums (1996–2000)
Shuichi - guitar (2000–2003), ex. Ability
Yusuke - bass (2000–2003), now in Not One Truth, ex.  Break Of Chain, ex. Hard Knock Life
Daiju - drums (2000–2003), now in Break Of Chain, ex. Hard Knock Life

Discography 
Full lengths
Till Death Do Us Part (1999, Handa & Company)

Demo
Life Is Pain demo (1996, self-release, cassette)

Splits
Split 7" with Comin Correct, "No Compromise" (1997, Back Ta Basics, 7")
"Blood Is Thicker Than Water" with Stinger (1998, Handa & Company / No Limit Records, 7")

Compilation appearances
Hardcore Ball 2 (1997, Straight Up Records, CD)
Clench The Fist (1997, CTF Records, 2CD)
Live Sampler Tape (1998, No Limit Records, cassette)
Nothing But A Hard Way (1998, Radical East, CD)
No Limit fanzine Vol.1 Sampler Tape (1998, No Limit Records, cassette)
Call For Unity vol.3 (2000, Back Ta Basics, CD)
There Is A Hard Core Making A Entry In 2000 (2000, Straight Up Records, 2CD)
Mad Dogz (2000, No Limit Records, CD)
Urban Warfare II-Terror (2001, Impak Musik, CD)
Tribute To John Holmez (2002, Hardcore Kitchen, CD)

External links 
Label website

Japanese hardcore punk groups
Musical groups from Miyagi Prefecture